The 1961 Winnipeg Blue Bombers finished in 1st place in the Western Conference with a 13–3 record. The Blue Bombers defeated the Hamilton Tiger-Cats to win the 49th Grey Cup.

Preseason

Regular season

Standings

Schedule

Playoffs

Grey Cup

References

Winnipeg Blue Bombers seasons
N. J. Taylor Trophy championship seasons
Grey Cup championship seasons
1961 Canadian Football League season by team